The Machine Intelligence Research Institute (MIRI), formerly the Singularity Institute for Artificial Intelligence (SIAI), is a non-profit research institute focused since 2005 on identifying and managing potential existential risks from artificial general intelligence. MIRI's work has focused on a friendly AI approach to system design and on predicting the rate of technology development.

History

In 2000, Eliezer Yudkowsky founded the Singularity Institute for Artificial Intelligence with funding from Brian and Sabine Atkins, with the purpose of accelerating the development of artificial intelligence (AI). However, Yudkowsky began to be concerned that AI systems developed in the future could become superintelligent and pose risks to humanity, and in 2005 the institute moved to Silicon Valley and began to focus on ways to identify and manage those risks, which were at the time largely ignored by scientists in the field. 

Starting in 2006, the Institute organized the Singularity Summit to discuss the future of AI including its risks, initially in cooperation with Stanford University and with funding from Peter Thiel. The San Francisco Chronicle described the first conference as a "Bay Area coming-out party for the tech-inspired philosophy called transhumanism". In 2011, its offices were four apartments in downtown Berkeley. In December 2012, the institute sold its name, web domain, and the Singularity Summit to Singularity University, and in the following month took the name "Machine Intelligence Research Institute".

In 2014 and 2015, public and scientific interest in the risks of AI grew, increasing donations to fund research at MIRI and similar organizations.

In 2019, Open Philanthropy recommended a general-support grant of approximately $2.1 million over two years to MIRI. In April 2020, Open Philanthropy supplemented this with a $7.7M grant over two years.

In 2021, Vitalik Buterin donated several million dollars worth of Ethereum to MIRI.

Research and approach

MIRI's approach to identifying and managing the risks of AI, led by Yudkowsky, primarily addresses how to design friendly AI, covering both the initial design of AI systems and the creation of mechanisms to ensure that evolving AI systems remain friendly.   

MIRI researchers advocate early safety work as a precautionary measure. However, MIRI researchers have expressed skepticism about the views of singularity advocates like Ray Kurzweil that superintelligence is "just around the corner". MIRI has funded forecasting work through an initiative called AI Impacts, which studies historical instances of discontinuous technological change, and has developed new measures of the relative computational power of humans and computer hardware.

MIRI aligns itself with the principles and objectives of the effective altruism movement.

Works by MIRI staff

See also
 Allen Institute for Artificial Intelligence
 Future of Humanity Institute
 Institute for Ethics and Emerging Technologies

References

Further reading

External links

Singularitarianism
Artificial intelligence associations
501(c)(3) organizations
Transhumanist organizations
Existential risk organizations
Existential risk from artificial general intelligence
2000 establishments in California
Organizations established in 2000
Organizations associated with effective altruism
Research institutes in California